United Congregational Church may refer to:

United Congregational Church (Bridgeport, Connecticut), listed on the National Register of Historic Places in Fairfield County, Connecticut
United Congregational Church (Newport, Rhode Island), listed on the National Register of Historic Places in Newport County, Rhode Island